Hypoponera confinis, is a species of ant of the subfamily Ponerinae, which can be found from Sri Lanka, and China.

Subspecies
Hypoponera confinis aitkenii Forel, 1900 - India
Hypoponera confinis confinis Forel, 1900 - Marshall Islands, Micronesia, New Guinea, Philippines, Samoa, Solomon Islands, Tonga, Bangladesh, India, Sri Lanka, China
Hypoponera confinis epinotalis Viehmeyer, 1916 - Singapore
Hypoponera confinis javana Forel, 1905 - Borneo, Indonesia, Philippines
Hypoponera confinis singaporensis Viehmeyer, 1916 - Singapore
Hypoponera confinis wroughtonii Forel, 1900 - India

References

Animaldiversity.org
Itis.org

External links

 at antwiki.org

Ponerinae
Hymenoptera of Asia
Insects described in 1860

Hymenoptera of New Zealand
Ants of New Zealand